On 31 July 1954, Italian climbers Achille Compagnoni and Lino Lacedelli became the first people to reach the summit of K2, the second highest mountain in the world after Mount Everest, which had been summited for the first time the previous year. The expedition was led by Ardito Desio.

There had been three earlier unsuccessful American attempts on the mountain but they had identified a good route to use. Desio felt Italy's earlier exploration of the Karakoram region gave good reason to mount a major expedition which he did on a grand scale, following the American route up the south-east ridge. Progress towards the summit was repeatedly interrupted by storms and one member of the team died rather unexpectedly. Desio considered abandoning the expedition so as to try again by  returning later in the year, but then weather conditions improved allowing them to edge closer to the top of the mountain. At last the two lead climbers reached the summit as the sun was about to set and they had to descend in the dark. They and two colleagues went on to suffer from severe frostbite.

The fact that the summit had been reached was never doubted – Compagnoni and Lacedelli had been seen by their colleagues near the summit and they had taken photographs and even a movie film from the top – but all the same the expedition became mired in argument. The official 1954 account of the expedition eventually became discredited and after a prolonged controversy a second official account was published in 2007 which largely confirmed the claims another member of the expedition, Walter Bonatti, had been making for over fifty years.

Background

K2 
K2 is on the border between China and what was in 1954 the newly independent Pakistan. At  it is the highest point of the Karakoram range and the second highest mountain in the world.
The mountain had been spotted in 1856 by the Great Trigonometrical Survey to Kashmir and by 1861 Henry Godwin-Austen had reached the Baltoro Glacier and was able to get a clear view of K2 from the slopes of Masherbrum. He could see the descending glacier eventually drained to the Indus River and so the mountain was in the British Empire.

The first serious attempt to climb the mountain was in 1902 by a party including Aleister Crowley, later to become notorious as "the Wickedest Man in the World". The expedition examined ascent routes both north and south of the mountain and made best progress up the north-east ridge before they were forced to abandon their efforts. Since that time K2 has developed the reputation of being a more difficult mountain to climb than Mount Everest – every route to the summit is tough. K2 is farther north than the Himalayan mountains so the climate is colder; the Karakoram range is wider than the Himalayan so more ice and snow is trapped there.

Before the successful Italian ascent, the expedition that had previously climbed highest on K2 had been the 1939 American Karakoram expedition which reached .

Previous Italian expeditions in the Baltoro Muztagh Karakoram 
In 1890 Roberto Lerco entered the Baltoro Muztagh region of the Karakoram. He reached the foot of K2 and may even have climbed a short way up its south-east spur but he did not leave an account of his journey.

This route later became known as the Abruzzi Ridge (or Abruzzi Spur) and eventually became regarded as the normal route to the summit.

In 1929 Aimone di Savoia-Aosta, the nephew of the Duke of the Abruzzi, led an expedition to explore the upper Baltoro Glacier, near to K2. The geologist on the party was Ardito Desio and he came to feel that there was an Italian claim for attempts on the mountain. It was only in 1939 that Desio could interest Italy's governing body for mountaineering, the Club Alpino Italiano (CAI) and then World War II and the Partition of India delayed things further. In 1952 Desio travelled to Pakistan as a preliminary for leading a full expedition in 1953 only to discover that the Americans had already booked the single climbing permit for that year. He returned in 1953 with Riccardo Cassin to reconnoitre the lower slopes of K2. At that time Cassin was the greatest Italian mountaineer there had been and yet in Desio's report of the reconnaissance Cassin is not mentioned except to say "I had chosen Ricardo Cassin, a climber, to whose travelling expenses the Italian Alpine Club had generously contributed". It was only after his return to Italy that Desio heard he had been granted the permit for the 1954 summit attempt.

Preparation for 1954 expedition 
In Rawalpindi, at the start of his 1953 visit to Pakistan, Desio had met Charlie Houston, leader of the unsuccessful 1953 American Karakoram expedition who was returning from K2. Even though the American was planning another attempt on the summit for 1954, he was generous in sharing his experience and photographs with Desio, an obvious rival.

Desio planned a far larger expedition than the American ones – the cost estimate of 100 million lira (equivalent to US$ million in ) was eight times greater than Houston's and three times greater than the successful 1953 British Everest expedition. It was sponsored by the CAI and it became a matter of national prestige, also involving the Italian Olympic Committee and the Italian National Research Council. The successes on Annapurna in 1950 and Mount Everest in 1953 had made an immense impact in France and Britain. Desio wrote "the expedition will of necessity be organised along military lines" – as in the 1950 French Annapurna expedition the climbers were all required to formally pledge allegiance to their leader. Scientific research –  geography and geology – was to be as important as reaching the top of the mountain. Indeed, it seems that Desio, professor of geology at Milan, held climbers in rather low regard.

There were ten Pakistani Hunza high-altitude porters, with Amir Mahdi (41) turning out to be the most prominent. Also on the team was a filmmaker,  and the doctor was Guido Pagani. The scientific team, in addition to Desio (who was 57 years old), comprised Paolo Graziosi (ethnographer),  (geophysicist),  (petrologist) and Francesco Lombardi (topographer). Muhammad Ata-Ullah was the Pakistani liaison officer.
Riccardo Cassin, the pre-eminent Italian Alpinist, had been nominated by the CAI as climbing leader but after Desio's rigorous selection procedures he was rejected, supposedly on medical grounds but it was speculated that it was really to avoid Desio being outshone.

Each camp was to be fully established before the next higher camp was occupied. Open-circuit oxygen systems were used and they were equipped with two-way radio.

The expedition left Italy by air in April 1954 and the baggage, which went by sea, arrived in Karachi on 13 April and then travelled by rail to Rawalpindi.

Official published accounts of the climb

Desio wrote the official account of the ascent in his 1954 book La Conquista del K2 but this account was disputed over many years by Bonatti and, eventually, Lacedelli and others. That Compagnoni and Lacedelli had reached the summit of K2 was not in dispute – at issue was the extent to which they had depended on support from other climbers high on the mountain, how they had treated Bonatti and Madhi, whether they used oxygen all the way to the top, and whether Desio's book was accurate and fair. The matter became increasingly controversial with a great deal of press criticism, often uninformed. Desio died in 2001 at the age of 104 and eventually in 2004 the CAI appointed three experts, called "" (the three wise men), to investigate. They produced a 39-page report in April 2004, but the CAI delayed until 2007 its publication of K2 – Una Storia Finita which included and accepted the  report.

The account of the climb given here is based on recent sources which have been able to take account of the CAI's second official report, K2 – Una Storia Finita (2007). The scientific (geographical and geological) aspects of the expedition are not covered nor is the controversy which went on for over fifty years after the return to Italy.

Approach to K2 

After delays due to poor weather, on 27 April the expedition flew by DC-3 from Rawalpindi to Skardu. Desio took the opportunity of using the aircraft to survey the region's topography and snow conditions, which seemed similar to those in Houston's photographs of the previous year. The mountains were higher than the aircraft's service ceiling so they needed to circumnavigate K2. The scientific party then departed on their separate itinerary.

Between Skardu and Askole several bridges had been built in the previous year so this part of the journey was much quicker than before. After Askole they were unable to buy food locally for the porters so they needed to hire another hundred men simply to carry flour for the main porters to make their chapatis. So as to minimise weight, Desio had provided little for the porters apart from food, a blanket each, and tarpaulins to be used as tents. They had no protective clothes. Unfortunately there was bad weather – snow as well as heavy rain whereas the previous year the weather had been fine and sunny – the porters started refusing to go on, even after being offered backsheesh. At Urdukas 120 porters turned back and the others halted – next morning some porters wandered back down and nobody would proceed. On Ata-Ullah's advice the sahibs went on ahead and, for a while, the porters disconsolately followed at a distance. Then there was a critical problem. The sun came out and, with it shining on the snow, the porters were struck with snow blindness. Snow goggles had been brought for them but half of them had been left behind to save weight. When eventually only one porter remained with the party they had to recruit fresh porters from back at Askole. By the time they had struggled to get Base Camp established on 28 May they had been delayed by fifteen days.

Line of ascent of K2 

The route to be taken was the same as for the American expeditions with camps planned for similar locations.

The Abruzzi Ridge can be climbed by strong climbers from Base Camp up to Camp VI in a few hours of good weather but it can also be a dangerous place to be. Between Camp IV and Camp VII the ridge is sharp, steep and unrelenting with exposure and rockfall being problems on the lower section. Strong winds can be a major difficulty – K2 partly protects the major eight-thousanders to the south but is itself very exposed to storms.

Progress on the mountain

Ascending the mountain
By 16 June Camp IV was established at the foot of House's Chimney, using the winch to haul supplies up to Camp II. In 1953 Houston's party had found the Hunzas to be better on the mountain than had been expected. However, Desio felt let down – part of the difficulty was that English was their only language in common and, apart from Desio himself, no one was fluent in English. Tragedy struck the expedition at an early stage: after Puchoz had descended to Camp II he developed problems with his throat and his condition deteriorated until, despite good medical treatment and ample medicines and oxygen, he died with symptoms of pneumonia on 21 June. The next day everyone descended to Base Camp just as a fierce snow storm erupted. When the storm abated they were able to recover Puchoz's body to Base Camp and on 27 June they ascended to bury him beside the memorial cairn to Art Gilkey who had died on the 1953 American expedition.

The expedition was by now almost a month behind schedule so Desio announced that the climb should be resumed immediately after the funeral. However, apart from Compagnoni, none of the climbers were willing to do this and Abram spoke up on their behalf. Desio had an authoritarian approach to leadership (behind his back he was called "il Ducetto", "little Mussolini"). He was in the habit of issuing written encouragements and orders. For example, on one occasion he pinned up a notice: 

When interviewed later about it Lacedelli said "We just ignored him and got on with it".

The climbers again spread out across the various camps and Compagnoni and Rey scaled House's Chimney but then another storm confined everyone to their tents. On 5 July, Compagnoni (who Desio had nominated to lead the high-level climbing), Abram and Gallotti established Camp V and then two days later reached Camp VI with fixed ropes now running all the way up from Camp I. They used the ropes from the 1953 expedition to reach camp VII although, on descending, the ropes slipped from their anchor points causing Floreanini to fall  but suffering no very serious injury.

On 18 July Compagnoni and Rey, followed by Bonatti and Lacedelli, set ropes as high as the American Camp VIII at the base of the summit plateau. Camp VI had been at the site of the American Camp VII but they moved it higher to avoid what they considered was a dangerous location. Successive severe storms made progress much slower than expected and Desio wrote to the CAI saying he was contemplating returning to Italy and staging a new assault in the autumn with a smaller team of fresh climbers, but using the existing fixed ropes. But then the weather improved. Next day they climbed higher but, unable to find a good location for their highest camp, Camp IX, they left their rucksacks and returned to Camp VIII, now realising they would need supplementary oxygen for the summit. By evening Mahdi and Isakhan reached Camp VII.

Preparing for the summit attempt
For 30 July the four men at Camp VIII agreed that while Compagnoni and Lacedelli would climb to try to establish Camp IX, Bonatti and Gallotti would descend to fetch the oxygen just above Camp VII and then carry the heavy oxygen equipment all the way up to Camp IX, via Camp VIII. They would tell climbers at Camp VII to bring up more supplies to VIII. They had very little food and, although they had oxygen masks with them, not the actual gas cylinders.

Bonatti, Gallotti, Abram, Mahdi and Isakhan all met and reached Camp VIII by noon on 30 July. At 15:30 Bonatti, Abram and Mahdi went on with the oxygen cylinders towards Camp IX. The Hunzas had not been provided with high-altitude boots and to induce Mahdi to go on higher Bonatti had offered him a cash bonus and had also hinted that he might be allowed to go right up to the summit. They went without a tent or sleeping bags. At about 16:30 they shouted and heard a reply from the summit team at Camp IX but could not locate them nor see any tracks to follow. They climbed higher but by 18:30 the sun was setting and Abram had to go down because of frostbite. They now could see tracks in the snow but still no tent and it would be dark imminently. Mahdi was starting to panic.

Bonatti dug out a small step in the ice in preparation for an emergency overnight bivouac without a tent or sleeping bags. After more shouting, at 22:00 a flashlight shone from quite nearby and slightly higher up the mountain and they could hear Lacedelli shouting to tell them to leave the oxygen and go back down. After that the light went out and there was silence. Bonatti and Mahdi spent the rest of the night in the open until at 05:30, against Bonatti's advice, Mahdi started going down by himself in the dark to Camp VIII. Bonatti waited until about 06:30 when it was getting light before he dug the oxygen sets out of the snow and descended. While he was going down he heard a shout from somewhere above but could not see anyone. Mahdi reached Camp VIII only slightly before Bonatti at about 07:30.

Reaching the summit 

At about 06:30–06:45 on 31 July Compagnoni and Lacedelli left their tent and saw someone (they could not tell who) descending and were shocked to think they must have spent the night in the open. They recovered the gas cylinders between about 07:15 and 07:45, and from there set off for the summit at about 08:30, now breathing supplementary oxygen. To save weight they abandoned their rucksacks and, for nourishment, only took sweets. The route through the Bottleneck was blocked with snow and they could not climb the cliffs as Wiessner had done in 1939. Eventually they found a line close to Wiessner's up though mixed ice and rock. The people below at Camp VIII were briefly able to see them ascending the final slope just before Compagnoni and Lacedelli reached the summit arm in arm at about 18:00, Saturday, 31 July. Gallotti wrote in his diary:  They took a few photos and a brief movie film as the sun was setting. Lacedelli wanted to go down as soon as possible but Compagnoni said he wanted to spend the night on the summit. Only after being threatened with Lacedelli's ice-axe did he turn to descend.

Descending the mountain

In the darkness they headed down this time descending Bottleneck Couloir and after a while their oxygen ran out. They had great difficulty crossing a crevasse and descending the ice wall just above Camp VIII and both men fell but  eventually their companions heard their shouts and emerged to help them back to Camp VIII just after 23:00. Next day, in poor weather, they descended the fixed ropes to Camp IV by 11:00. By 2 August everyone was back at Base Camp. Compagnoni, Lacedelli and Bonatti had serious frostbite to their hands but Mahdi's feet were also affected and his condition was much worse.

Return home
On 3 August the news of the success reached Italy but, in accordance with an earlier collective agreement suggested by Floreanini, the names of the climbers who had reached the summit were kept secret. Their triumph was very big news in Italy, but internationally it made less impact than the previous year's ascent of Everest, which had been boosted by the coronation of Elizabeth II. After some recuperation the party left base camp on 11 August with Compagnoni going ahead, wanting to hasten to Italy for hospital treatment. Lacedelli, with Pagnini's medical support, preferred to take things more slowly to try to avoid unnecessary amputations of his fingers. Mahdi was much the worst affected and went to hospital in Skardu, eventually having nearly all his fingers and toes amputated.

The press speculated, mostly correctly, on who had been in the summit party and when Compagnoni flew into Rome in early September he was treated as a hero. The main party arrived at Genoa by sea later in September and Desio flew in to Rome in October. At the height of the celebrations on 12 October Desio announced the names of those who had reached the summit. This news flopped because it had been repeatedly reported (through speculation) for months. Earlier the CAI, while still refusing to name who they were, had published a photo of Compagnoni and Lacedelli on the summit.

However, before the party had left Pakistan, a scandal had been making headlines in the subcontinent's press.  Mahdi had been reported as saying he had been within  of the summit but his two Italian companions had not allowed him to go any higher. This received very little attention internationally but the matter was serious enough for the Italian ambassador to Karachi to hold an inquiry. He did not speak to Mahdi but interviewed the Italians involved as well as Ata-Ullah, the liaison officer, to whom Mahdi had made his complaints. The report concluded that no porters had been near the summit; Bonatti and Mahdi turned back below Camp IX leaving the oxygen respirators; and Mahdi had been wild and undisciplined trying to escape the bivouac. This satisfied the Pakistan government and even the press calmed down. However, it was only very many years later that Bonatti came to believe that in reality Desio regarded the report as a cover-up (one that Desio approved of) for what he believed had been Bonatti's attempt to sabotage the expedition. This was to cause repercussions over the next fifty years.

It was not until 1977 that the summit of K2 was reached again, by a well equipped, relatively modern Japanese expedition, with fifty-nine climbers and 1500 porters, who again took the Abruzzi ridge.

Notes

References

Citations

Works cited 
 English translation of  
 The video is hosted on Vimeo at https://vimeo.com/54661540

 English translation of  

 Translated into English in 
 Translated into English in   report
 Translated into English and summarized in  Club Alpino Italiano report 

 page numbers from Aldiko  Android app showing entire book as 305 pages.
 page numbers from Aldiko Android app showing entire book as 284 pages.

Italian sources and further reading 

 Translated into English in On the Heights 
 English translation of  
 Translated into English in The Mountains of My Life 
 Translated into English in Victory over K2 

K2
Karakoram expedition
K2 expedition
Italian K2 expedition, 1954
Italian K2 expedition, 1954
1954 Italian Karakoram expedition to K2
Italy–Pakistan relations
Club Alpino Italiano